Alcantarea nahoumii is a plant species in the genus Alcantarea. This species is native to Brazil.

References

nahoumii
Flora of Brazil